Birds described in 1879 include the grey-headed silverbill, Macquarie rail, flame bowerbird, Cockerell's fantail, rufous-vented niltava, slaty cuckooshrike, Makira dwarf kingfisher, black-billed turaco, dusky-backed jacamar, buff-bellied tanager and the Santa Marta sabrewing, Rodrigues starling.

Events
Death of Ludwig Reichenbach.
Johann Büttikofer begins exploring Liberia.

Publications
Luigi D'Albertis (1879). "Journeys up the Fly River and in other parts of New Guinea". Proceedings of the Royal Geographical Society: 4–16 (including map).
Anton Reichenow (1879). "Neue Vögel aus Ostafrika". Ornithologisches Centralblatt. 4: 107–155.
Władysław Taczanowski (1879). "Liste des Oiseaux recueillis au nord du Pérou par M.M. Stolzmann et Jelski em 1878". Proceedings of the Zoological Society of London. Part 2: 220–245.
Osbert Salvin and Frederick DuCane Godman (1879–1904). Biologia Centrali-Americana. Aves. Vol.1: i–xliv; 1–512.
Genevieve Estelle Jones (1879–1886). Illustrations of the Nests and Eggs of Birds of Ohio.
Adolf Bernhard Meyer Abbildungen von Vogelskeletten (1879–95).Volume 1, Volume 2. (in German).
Alfred Grandidier Histoire physique, naturelle, et politique de Madagascar Paris :Impr. nationale online BHL Oiseaux vols 12-15 1879-1881

Ongoing events
John Gould The Birds of Asia 1850–83 7 vols. 530 plates, Artists: J. Gould, H. C. Richter, W. Hart and J. Wolf; Lithographers: H. C. Richter and W. Hart
Henry Eeles Dresser and Richard Bowdler Sharpe  A History of the Birds of Europe, Including all the Species Inhabiting the Western Palearctic Region. Taylor & Francis of Fleet Street, London
José Vicente Barbosa du Bocage Ornithologie d'Angola. 2 volumes, 1877–1881.
The Ibis

References

Bird
Birding and ornithology by year